Ricardo Rodríguez-Pace (born 28 April 1993) is a Venezuelan professional tennis player. He achieved a career high ATP ranking of World No. 282 on June 9, 2014. Born in Caracas, Venezuela, Rodríguez started playing tennis at the age of seven and achieved more success on singles. He entered the pro circuit in 2008 and has won ten Futures tournaments in singles and nine in doubles. Rodríguez is also a member of the Venezuela Davis Cup team where he holds the record of most singles victories in the history of Venezuela (22-9) in 17 appearances.

Rodriguez made his first appearance in Davis Cup in February 2012, in the tie played in Caracas against Puerto Rico, for the first round of America's group II. Rodriguez won 6 singles in a row, breaking the previous record of most singles wins without losing held by Isaias Pimentel (3-0). In the 2013 campaign, Rodriguez went undefeated to take Venezuela into America's group I, winning 4 singles in 3 ties (Guatemala, Peru, El Salvador). Rodriguez continued playing Davis Cup helping Venezuela to reach 3 consecutive America's group II finals, after the relegation of the 2014 Davis Cup campaign. In February 2018, Rodriguez breaks the record of most singles victories in the history of Venezuela's Davis Cup, by beating the player number 1 of Guatemala Christofer Diaz with scores of (4-6, 6–3, 6-0) and clinching the last point to win the tie. Later that year he added one more victory to consolidate his Davis Cup performance against Uruguay.

As a singles player, Rodriguez has combined his participations between the Challenger Tour and the Futures Tour. Combined, he has a positive record of 317-196 (W-L), with a total of 10 titles in three different continents, making him the best ranked player of Venezuela in the past 6 years.

Mainly focused in singles, as a doubles player Rodriguez won 6 doubles titles with four different partners, reaching his highest doubles ranking in October 2016 of 670 in the world.

As a junior, Rodriguez got his highest ranking of Number 10 in the world (January 2010) where he competed in two Grand Slams (Roland Garros and US Open), one Grade A (Copa Gerdau, Brazil) reaching to semifinals, and became the first Venezuelan in the history to play a Youth Olympic Games (Singapore 2010) where amongst with his partner from Paraguay Diego Galeano, lost the match for the bronze medal.

References

External links
 
 
 

Living people
1993 births
Venezuelan male tennis players
Tennis players at the 2010 Summer Youth Olympics
Tennis players at the 2015 Pan American Games
Competitors at the 2010 South American Games
South American Games gold medalists for Venezuela
South American Games medalists in tennis
Pan American Games competitors for Venezuela
21st-century Venezuelan people